Federal Route 74, or Jalan Taiping–Kuala Sepetang, is a federal road in Perak, Malaysia. The 17.1 km (10.6 mi) roads connects Taiping to Kuala Sepetang (formerly Port Weld). The road was built at the site of the first railway line in Malaysia from Taiping to Port Weld in 1885.

Route background
The Kilometre Zero of the Federal Route 74 starts at Kuala Sepetang (formerly Port Weld).

History

The road used to be a main railway line of Taiping–Port Weld, the first railway line in Malaysia. Construction of the railway began in 1884 and was completed in 1885. The railway line starting from Port Weld passing Jebong, Simpang Halt and finally Taiping. Service began on 1 February 1885, lasting until 1941. After dismantled, the railway line is now the main road section from Port Weld (now Kuala Sepetang) to Sekolah Kebangsaan Ngah Ibrahim, Matang and the village road section of Jalan Jebong and Jalan Simpang Halt from Jebong to Taiping.

Stations
Taiping
Simpang Halt
Jebong
Port Weld

Features
The former Port Weld railway station and signage at Kuala Sepetang.
Kota Ngah Ibrahim

At most sections, the Federal Route 74 was built under the JKR R5 road standard, allowing maximum speed limit of up to 90 km/h.

List of junctions and towns

References

074